The city of Hamburg in Germany is made up of seven boroughs (German: Bezirke, also known as districts or administrative districts) and subdivided into 104 quarters (German: Stadtteile). Most of the quarters were former independent settlements. The areal organisation is regulated by the constitution of Hamburg and several laws. The subdivision into boroughs and quarters was last modified in March 2008.

Borough overview

History

The first official administrative divisions of Hamburg were the parishes of four churches, the St. Peter's, St. Catherine's, St. James's and St. Nicholas's Churches (or their preceding buildings). On 24 February, 1529 a compromise of 132 articles between the senate of Hamburg and the citizens (German: Langer Rezeß) established a council of citizens. The twelve councilmen were called Oberalte (eldermen) and were the three oldest deacons of each parish. Each parish was given a confirmed border.

1871
In 1871 at the declaration of the German Reich the State of Hamburg consisted of the city of Hamburg with Altstadt (Old city), Neustadt (New city) and St. Georg (Hamburg since 1868). A suburb called St. Pauli and several directly named outskirts and the other land.

In the north former parts of the Province of Schleswig-Holstein with its municipalities Rotherbaum, Harvestehude, Eimsbüttel, Eppendorf, Winterhude, Uhlenhorst, Barmbeck, Eilbek, Hohenfelde, Borgfelde, Hamm, Horn, Billwärder-Ausschlag, Steinwärder mit Grevenhof and the Kleiner Grasbrook. Rural areas have been e.g. Großborstel, Fuhlsbüttel, Langenhorn, Alsterdorf, Ohlsdorf, Kleinborstel, Struckholt. Localities named as Walddörfer (forest villages) Farmsen with Berne, Volksdorf, Wohldorf and Olstedt, Groß-Hansdorf and Schmalenbeck.

In the south rural areas between Bille and Elbe are located Billwärder an der Bille, Moorfleeth, Allermöhe, Spadenland, Tatenberg, Ochsenwärder and Reitbrook.

Several villages and rural areas are located south of river Elbe, e.g. Moorwärder, Kaltenhofe, Peute, Die große Veddel, Die kleine Veddel, Niedernfelde, Klütjenfelde, Ellerholz, Ross, Waltershof, Mühlenwärder, Dradenau and the municipalities Finkenwärder and Moorburg.

The city of Bergedorf and municipalities Curslak, Altengamme, Neuengamme, Kirchwärder, Krauel and Geesthacht. And the municipalities Cuxhaven, Groden, Döse, Süderwisch und Westerwisch, Stickenbüttel, Sahlenburg, Duhnen, Holte and Spangen, Arensch und Berensch, Oxstedt, Gudendorf and the island Neuwerk.

The Greater Hamburg Act

At 1 April 1938 due to the Gesetz über Groß-Hamburg und andere Gebietsbereinigungen (Greater Hamburg Act) (from 26 January 1937) the State Hamburg lost all its rural areas, they became part of the state of Hamburg. The city also gained considerable area from the province of Schleswig-Holstein as Altona and Wandsbek both became administrative districts of Hamburg. Furthermore, rural districts Bergstedt, Billstedt, Bramstedt, Bramfeld, Duvenstedt, Hummelsbüttel, Lemsahl-Mellingstedt, Lohbrügge, Poppenbüttel, Rahlstedt, Sasel, Steilshoop und Wellingsbüttel, Kurslack im Achterschlag, Lokstedt were added to the state's area. The Province of Hanover handed over the city district of Harburg-Wilhelmsburg. The settlements of the rural districts Altenwerder, Cranz, Finkenwerder, Fischbek, Francop, Gut Moor, Hannöversch Kirchwerder, Langenbek, Marmstorf, Neuenfelde, Neugraben, Neuland, Rönneburg, Sinstorf and parts of Over therefore became quarters within the state's borders.

Hamburg lost Cuxhaven, Geesthacht, Schmalenbeck, Groß Hansdorf and the isles of Neuwerk, Scharnhörn and Niegehörn.

1945 and later
In 1969 the isles were handed back to Hamburg and administered from the borough of Hamburg-Mitte ever since.

1 March 2008 the quarter Wilhelmsburg became part of the borough Hamburg-Mitte. The neighbourhood Schanzenviertel in the boroughs Altona, Eimsbüttel and Hamburg-Mitte became the quarter Sternschanze in the borough Altona. The neighborhood HafenCity was awarded the status of a quarter.

Boroughs

A borough of Hamburg is not comparable to other local administrations in Germany. The Constitution of Hamburg determines that Hamburg is both a state and a single municipality. But it allows that boroughs can be formed for the purpose of local administrative. The boroughs have minor rights to determine local administration.

Borough councils
The boroughs of Hamburg have their own local council (German: Bezirksversammlung, literally 'district assembly'). The members of the Bezirksversammlung are elected every four years under a system of proportional representation. It consists of 45, 51 or 57 representatives, depending on the population of the borough. In addition to Germans, all citizen of European Union states are entitled to vote if on the day of election they have been have registered their residency in Hamburg for at least three months.

The borough councils powers is mostly to be heard in questions of local importance (e.g. the location of fire brigade stations, schools etc.) and to prioritise the work of the borough administration (Bezirksamt).

Head of Borough Administration
The administrative leader of each borough is called Bezirksamtsleiter (municipal councillor) and is elected by the borough council, although they must also be confirmed by the Senat, Hamburg's state cabinet.

Quarters
The 104 quarters of Hamburg are not politically independent, but have officially recognised borders. They have no self-government or administration. Historically, most quarters began as an independent rural, urban, or suburban locality and they form the basis of the state and city of Hamburg. Their historical roots as a settlement can often be observed in the endings of their names, such as Bergedorf - dorf means village and berg means mountain, so Bergedorf is the village in the mountains. Some quarters are made up of several officially recognised locations, not to be confused with by inhabitants so called neighbourhoods. In total, Hamburg is subdivided into 181 such localities (German: Ortsteile). St. Pauli quarter is much larger than the neighbourhood St. Pauli or Kiez which means the area around the Reeperbahn.

Areal organisation
Altona borough consists of the quarters Altona-Altstadt, Altona-Nord, Bahrenfeld, Blankenese, Groß Flottbek, Iserbrook, Lurup, Nienstedten, Osdorf, Othmarschen, Ottensen, Rissen, Sternschanze and Sülldorf.

The quarters Allermöhe, Altengamme, Bergedorf, Billwerder, Curslack, Kirchwerder, Lohbrügge, Moorfleet, Neuallermöhe, Neuengamme, Ochsenwerder, Reitbrook, Spadenland and Tatenberg belong to the Bergedorf borough.

The quarters Billbrook, Billstedt, Borgfelde, Finkenwerder, HafenCity, Hamburg-Altstadt, Hamm, Hammerbrook, Horn, Kleiner Grasbrook, Neustadt, Neuwerk, Rothenburgsort, Steinwerder, St. Georg, St. Pauli, Veddel, Waltershof and Wilhelmsburg belong to the borough Hamburg-Mitte.

Hamburg-Nord borough is made up of the quarters Alsterdorf, Barmbek-Nord, Barmbek-Süd, Dulsberg, Eppendorf, Fuhlsbüttel, Groß Borstel, Hoheluft-Ost, Hohenfelde, Langenhorn, Ohlsdorf, Uhlenhorst and Winterhude.

Altenwerder, Cranz, Eißendorf, Francop, Gut Moor, Harburg, Hausbruch, Heimfeld, Langenbek, Marmstorf, Moorburg, Neuenfelde, Neugraben-Fischbek, Neuland, Rönneburg, Sinstorf and Wilstorf are quarters in the borough of Harburg.

The Wandsbek borough consists of Bergstedt, Bramfeld, Duvenstedt, Eilbek, Farmsen-Berne, Hummelsbüttel, Jenfeld, Lemsahl-Mellingstedt, Marienthal, Poppenbüttel, Rahlstedt, Sasel, Steilshoop, Tonndorf, Volksdorf, Wandsbek, Wellingsbüttel and Wohldorf-Ohlstedt.

Eimsbüttel is split into nine quarters: Eidelstedt, Eimsbüttel, Harvestehude, Hoheluft-West, Lokstedt, Niendorf, Rotherbaum, Schnelsen and Stellingen.

For statistical purpose the borough Hamburg-Mitte has the group/area called Schiffsbevölkerung (people living on ships).

In alphabetical order 

 Allermöhe
 Alsterdorf
 Altengamme
 Altenwerder
 Altona-Altstadt
 Altona-Nord
 Bahrenfeld
 Barmbek-Nord
 Barmbek-Süd
 Bergedorf
 Bergstedt
 Billbrook
 Billwerder
 Billstedt
 Blankenese
 Borgfelde
 Bramfeld
 Cranz
 Curslack
 Dulsberg
 Duvenstedt
 Eidelstedt
 Eilbek
 Eimsbüttel
 Eißendorf
 Eppendorf
 Farmsen-Berne
 Finkenwerder
 Francop
 Fuhlsbüttel
 Groß Borstel
 Groß Flottbek
 Gut Moor
 HafenCity
 Hamburg-Altstadt
 Hamm
 Hammerbrook
 Harburg
 Harvestehude
 Hausbruch
 Heimfeld
 Hoheluft-Ost
 Hoheluft-West
 Hohenfelde
 Horn
 Hummelsbüttel
 Iserbrook
 Jenfeld
 Kirchwerder
 Kleiner Grasbrook
 Langenbek
 Langenhorn
 Lemsahl-Mellingstedt
 Lohbrügge
 Lokstedt
 Lurup
 Marienthal
 Marmstorf
 Moorburg
 Moorfleet
 Neuallermöhe
 Neuenfelde
 Neuengamme
 Neugraben-Fischbek
 Neuland
 Neustadt
 Neuwerk
 Niendorf
 Nienstedten
 Ochsenwerder
 Ohlsdorf
 Osdorf
 Othmarschen
 Ottensen
 Poppenbüttel
 Rahlstedt
 Reitbrook
 Rissen
 Rönneburg
 Rothenburgsort
 Rotherbaum
 Sasel
 Schnelsen
 Sinstorf
 Spadenland
 St. Georg
 St. Pauli
 Steilshoop
 Steinwerder
 Stellingen
 Sternschanze
 Sülldorf
 Tatenberg
 Tonndorf
 Uhlenhorst
 Veddel
 Volksdorf
 Wandsbek
 Waltershof
 Wellingsbüttel
 Wilhelmsburg
 Wilstorf
 Winterhude
 Wohldorf-Ohlstedt

Notes

See also
Hamburg Metropolitan Region

References 

General

 Constitution of Hamburg from  6 June 1952, last change 16 May 2001 Verfassung der Freien und Hansestadt Hamburg 
 Borough administration act Bezirksverwaltungsgesetz (BezVG) 
 Act of the areal organisation, 6 July 2006 Gesetz über die räumliche Gliederung der Freien und Hansestadt Hamburg (RäumGiG)  
 Streets and localities in Hamburg Straßen- und Gebietsverzeichnis der Freien und Hansestadt Hamburg 2008, Statistical office Hamburg and Schleswig-Holstein Statistisches Amt für Hamburg und Schleswig-Holstein, Hamburg, Germany

Parts translated from :de:Bezirke in Hamburg

External links

 

Politics of Hamburg